Fernando Gazapo (24 August 1920 – 24 December 2003) was a Spanish equestrian. He competed in two events at the 1948 Summer Olympics.

References

1920 births
2003 deaths
Spanish male equestrians
Olympic equestrians of Spain
Equestrians at the 1948 Summer Olympics
Place of birth missing